Leif Murphy (born October 23, 1979) is a former professional American football defensive end. He is one of Indoor Football's most prolific producers in the Sack and Tackle For Loss, categories.

Career
In Murphy's high school years, he earned the All-State and Defensive Player of the Year awards at Spring Lake Park High School in Minnesota. In college, he was a four-year starter at North Dakota State University from 1999 to 2002, All-America First Team selection as a junior in 2001 after leading the Bison with 11 sacks. He completed his collegiate career with 129 tackles and 22 sacks.

Murphy began the 2003 season with the Canadian Football League's Ottawa Renegades before joining the Bismarck Roughriders of the National Indoor Football League (NIFL). Next year in 2004 he played for the Tri-City Diesel of the NIFL, and was named Pacific Conference Defensive Player of the Year.

He played for the United Bowl Champion Sioux Falls Storm in 2007, and the Omaha Beef in 2005 and 2006. Both teams were members of United Indoor Football. He was named All-UIF all three seasons. He was part of the Sioux Falls Storm's record 40 game winning streak.

In 2008, as a member of the Grand Rapids Rampage, of the Arena Football League, he was second on the team in sacks despite seeing limited action due to injury.

References
 at SiouxFallsStorm.com
Leif Murphy at RampageFootball.com
Just Sports Stats

1979 births
Living people
Players of American football from Michigan
American football defensive ends
North Dakota State Bison football players
Canadian football linebackers
Ottawa Renegades players
Grand Rapids Rampage players
Sioux Falls Storm players
Omaha Beef players
Sioux City Bandits players
Bismarck Roughriders players
Players of American football from Minnesota